Horatio Nelson Poole (1884–1949) was an American painter, printmaker, muralist and teacher.

Poole is known for both his intaglio prints (such as Fruit and Grain) and paintings (such as A View of Honolulu near Old Plantation). The Fine Arts Museums of San Francisco, the Honolulu Museum of Art, the Isaacs Art Center (Waimea, Hawaii), Mills College, and the Oakland Museum of California are among the public collections holding work by Horatio Nelson Poole.

Life
Poole was born in Haddonfield, New Jersey on January 16, 1884, but his family moved to Philadelphia when Horatio was ten years old. He studied at the M Street High School, Philadelphia's School of Industrial Design, and then with Thomas Pollock Anshutz at the Pennsylvania Academy of the Fine Arts.

Poole moved to Hawaii in 1914, where he worked as an illustrator for the Pacific Commercial Advertiser and the Honolulu Star-Bulletin. In 1921, he left Hawaii for San Francisco, where he taught at the California School of Fine Arts and at the University of California, Berkeley. He painted a 20-foot mural in San Francisco’s Roosevelt Jr. High School for the Public Works Administration during the 1930s. Poole died in San Francisco July 4, 1949.  Horatio's brothers John C. Poole (1887-1926)and Earl L. Poole (1891-1972) were also artists.

Works
 1916 - A View of Honolulu near Old Plantation, oil on art board
 1927 - Fruit & Grain, drypoint
 1929 - Monterey Oak, oil on canvas, Shasta State Historic Park, Shasta County, California
 Various bookplates

Examples of Bookplates by Horatio Nelson Poole

References
 Hughes, Edan, Artists in California 1786-1940, Sacramento, Crocker Art Museum, 2002.
 Papanikolas, Theresa and DeSoto Brown, Art Deco Hawai'i, Honolulu, Honolulu Museum of Art, 2014, p. 97
 Severson, Don R. Finding Paradise: Island Art in Private Collections, University of Hawaii Press, 2002, p. 109-10, 132, 142.

External links
 Horatio Nelson Poole in AskArt.com
 Smithsonian American Art Museum, Art Inventories Catalog
Bookplates by Horatio Nelson Poole in the University of Delaware Library's William Augustus Brewer Bookplate Collection

Footnotes

1884 births
1949 deaths
20th-century American painters
American male painters
American muralists
People from Haddonfield, New Jersey
Printmakers from Hawaii
20th-century American printmakers
20th-century American male artists